Great Central Lake is a lake on Vancouver Island, British Columbia, Canada. It is located north of Sproat Lake and to the northwest of the city of Port Alberni. The lake is long and narrow, with the exception of Trestle Bay located on the east end of the lake. It is nestled beneath low mountains, with second-growth forest surrounding most of the lake. The water level is controlled by a dam on the east side.

There are approximately 70 residents that live in float houses along the shoreline. Fishing, boating, skiing, wakeboarding, swimming, hiking, camping, and ATVing are common activities on and around the lake.

Geography
Great Central Lake is an oligotrophic lake on Vancouver Island. The lake is long and narrow, with the exception of Trestle Bay located on the east end of the lake. It is nestled beneath low mountains, with second-growth forest surrounding most of the lake. The relatively steep shoreline has kept Great Central Lake mostly undeveloped, but there are approximately 70 residents that live in float houses along the shoreline. The water level is controlled by a dam on the east side.

Fishing, boating, skiing, wakeboarding, swimming, hiking, camping, and ATVing are common activities carried out on and around the lake. Notable features of Great Central Lake and the immediate surroundings include the natural waterslides at Dorothy Creek and Della Falls, as well as the city of Port Alberni. Great Central Lake is the headwaters of the Stamp River, a popular location for steelhead salmon fishing.

History 
The name "Central Lake" appeared in the Vancouver Island Exploring Expedition route plan in 1864. A map of British Columbia from 1871 first referred to it as "Great Central" lake and the name was officially adopted in 1948.

From 1970 to 1974 the lake was fertilized annually in an experiment to enhance the production of sockeye salmon.

Della Falls Trail 

The Della falls trail is a 7-hour hike to the base of Della Falls in Strathcona Provincial Park and is only accessible by boat or water taxi. There are multiple campsites along the trail.

Nearby Urban Centres 

Port Alberni is Great Central Lake's closest urban center, approximately 16 kilometers away from the Great Central Lake RV Resort campsite. Port Alberni offers various services including kayak rentals, paddle board rentals, grocery stores, and fishing charters and equipment suppliers.

References 

Alberni Valley
Lakes of Vancouver Island
Lakes of British Columbia
Clayoquot Land District